Fairfield Township is one of the seventeen townships of Highland County, Ohio, United States. As of the 2010 census the population was 3,764, up from 3,219 at the 2000 census. In 2010, 2,196 of the population lived in the unincorporated portion of the township.

Geography
Located in the northern part of the county, it borders the following townships:
Green Township, Fayette County - north
Perry Township, Fayette County - northeast corner
Madison Township - east
Paint Township - southeast
Penn Township - southwest
Green Township, Clinton County - west
Wayne Township, Clinton County - northwest

Two incorporated villages are located in Fairfield Township: Highland in the west, and Leesburg in the center.

Name and history
It is one of seven Fairfield Townships statewide.

Government
The township is governed by a three-member board of trustees, who are elected in November of odd-numbered years to a four-year term beginning on the following January 1. Two are elected in the year after the presidential election and one is elected in the year before it. There is also an elected township fiscal officer, who serves a four-year term beginning on April 1 of the year after the election, which is held in November of the year before the presidential election. Vacancies in the fiscal officership or on the board of trustees are filled by the remaining trustees.

References

External links
County website

Townships in Highland County, Ohio
Townships in Ohio